, more commonly , is a Japanese temple in 4-16-23, Mita, Minato, Tokyo (on the Tsuki no Misaki). Its religious sect and principal image are Pure Land Buddhism and Amitābha respectively.

This is a 26th the place where can get the green paper of Edo thirty three Kannon hallow ground.

History 

Meiwa 7 (1621) St. Munen found this. Ansei 6 (1856), it was the France consulate general and two years after became legation. Now, the monument of the first remains of the France minister government residence stands in the precincts of a temple.

Geography 
This is located on the sea side of the Tsuki no Misaki highland, and next to Kamezuka Kohen. During the Edo period, people were able to see the unparalleled view toward the Edo bay from there.

See also
 France–Japan relations (19th century)

External links

Buddhist temples in Tokyo
Buildings and structures in Minato, Tokyo